John McCloughlin is an Irish international lawn and indoor bowler born on 9 March 1958.

He was born in Lisburn and has been bowling since the age of eleven. He has represented Ireland both indoors and outdoors. His greatest moment came when winning the gold medal in the 1988 World Outdoor Bowls Championship fours. He has also won three medals at the Commonwealth Games, a bronze medal in the 1982 Commonwealth Games fours, a silver medal in the 1990 Commonwealth Games fours and another bronze at the 1994 Commonwealth Games fours.

References

Male lawn bowls players from Northern Ireland
Living people
1958 births
Sportspeople from Lisburn
Commonwealth Games medallists in lawn bowls
Commonwealth Games silver medallists for Northern Ireland
Commonwealth Games bronze medallists for Northern Ireland
Bowls World Champions
Bowls players at the 1982 Commonwealth Games
Bowls players at the 1990 Commonwealth Games
Bowls players at the 1994 Commonwealth Games
Medallists at the 1982 Commonwealth Games
Medallists at the 1990 Commonwealth Games
Medallists at the 1994 Commonwealth Games